Zopiclone, sold under the brand name Imovane among others, is a nonbenzodiazepine used to treat difficulty sleeping. Zopiclone is molecularly distinct from benzodiazepine drugs and is classed as a cyclopyrrolone. However, zopiclone increases the normal transmission of the neurotransmitter gamma-aminobutyric acid (GABA) in the central nervous system, via modulating GABAA receptors similarly to the way benzodiazepine drugs do.

Zopiclone is a sedative. It works by causing a depression or tranquilization of the central nervous system.  After prolonged use, the body can become accustomed to the effects of zopiclone. When the dose is then reduced or the drug is abruptly stopped, withdrawal symptoms may result. These can include a range of symptoms similar to those of benzodiazepine withdrawal. Although withdrawal symptoms from therapeutic doses of zopiclone and its isomers (i.e., eszopiclone) do not typically present with convulsions and are therefore not considered life-threatening, patients may experience such significant agitation or anxiety that they seek emergency medical attention.

In the United States, zopiclone is not commercially available, although its active stereoisomer, eszopiclone, is. Zopiclone is a controlled substance in the United States, Japan, Brazil, and some European countries, and may be illegal to possess without a prescription. However, it is readily available in other countries and is not a controlled substance.

Zopiclone is known colloquially as a "Z-drug". Other Z-drugs include zaleplon and zolpidem and were initially thought to be less addictive than benzodiazepines. However, this appraisal has shifted somewhat in the last few years as cases of addiction and habituation have been presented. Zopiclone is recommended to be taken on a short-term basis, usually no more than a week or two. Daily or continuous use of the drug is not usually advised, and caution must be taken when the compound is used in conjunction with antidepressants, sedatives or other drugs affecting the central nervous system.

Medical uses

Zopiclone is used for the short-term treatment of insomnia where sleep initiation or sleep maintenance are prominent symptoms. Long-term use is not recommended, as tolerance, dependence, and addiction can occur. One low-quality study found that zopiclone is ineffective in improving sleep quality or increasing sleep time in shift workers, and more research in this area has been recommended.

Cognitive behavioral therapy has been found to be superior to zopiclone in the treatment of insomnia and has been found to have lasting effects on sleep quality for at least a year after therapy.

Specific populations

Elderly
Zopiclone, similar to other benzodiazepines and nonbenzodiazepine hypnotic drugs, causes impairments in body balance and standing steadiness in individuals who wake up at night or the next morning. Falls and hip fractures are frequently reported. The combination with alcohol consumption increases these impairments. Partial, but incomplete tolerance develops to these impairments. 
Zopiclone increases postural sway and increases the number of falls in older people, as well as cognitive side effects. Falls are a significant cause of death in older people.

An extensive review of the medical literature regarding the management of insomnia and the elderly found that considerable evidence of the effectiveness and lasting benefits of nondrug treatments for insomnia exist. Compared with the benzodiazepines, the nonbenzodiazepine sedative-hypnotics, such as zopiclone, offer few if any advantages in efficacy or tolerability in elderly persons. Newer agents such as the melatonin receptor agonists may be more suitable and effective for the management of chronic insomnia in elderly people. Long-term use of sedative-hypnotics for insomnia lacks an evidence base and is discouraged for reasons that include concerns about such potential adverse drug effects as cognitive impairment (anterograde amnesia), daytime sedation, motor incoordination, and increased risk of motor vehicle accidents and falls. In addition, the effectiveness and safety of long-term use of nonbenzodiazepine hypnotic drugs remains to be determined.

Liver disease
Patients with liver disease eliminate zopiclone much more slowly than normal patients and in addition experience exaggerated pharmacological effects of the drug.

Adverse reactions
Sleeping pills, including zopiclone, have been associated with an increased risk of death. The British National Formulary states adverse reactions as follows: "taste disturbance (some report a metallic like taste); less commonly nausea, vomiting, dizziness, drowsiness, dry mouth, headache; rarely amnesia, confusion, depression, hallucinations, nightmares; very rarely light headedness, incoordination, paradoxical effects [...] and sleep-walking also reported".

Contraindications
Zopiclone causes impaired driving skills similar to those of benzodiazepines. Long-term users of hypnotic drugs for sleep disorders develop only partial tolerance to adverse effects on driving with users of hypnotic drugs even after one year of use still showing an increased motor vehicle accident rate. Patients who drive motor vehicles should not take zopiclone unless they stop driving due to a significant increased risk of accidents in zopiclone users. Zopiclone induces impairment of psychomotor function. Driving or operating machinery should be avoided after taking zopiclone as effects can carry over to the next day, including impaired hand eye coordination.

EEG and sleep
It causes similar alterations on EEG readings and sleep architecture as benzodiazepines and causes disturbances in sleep architecture on withdrawal as part of its rebound effect. Zopiclone reduces both delta waves and the number of high-amplitude delta waves whilst increasing low-amplitude waves. Zopiclone reduces the total amount of time spent in REM sleep as well as delaying its onset. In EEG studies, zopiclone significantly increases the energy of the beta frequency band, increasing stage 2. Zopiclone is less selective to the α1 site and has higher affinity to the α2 site than zaleplon. Zopiclone is therefore very similar pharmacologically to benzodiazepines.

Overdose
Zopiclone is sometimes used as a method of suicide. It has a similar fatality index to that of  benzodiazepine drugs, apart from temazepam, which is particularly toxic in overdose. Deaths have occurred from zopiclone overdose, alone or in combination with other drugs. Overdose of zopiclone may present with excessive sedation and depressed respiratory function that may progress to coma and possibly death. Zopiclone combined with alcohol, opiates, or other central nervous system depressants may be even more likely to lead to fatal overdoses. Zopiclone overdosage can be treated with the GABAA receptor benzodiazepine site antagonist flumazenil, which displaces zopiclone from its binding site, thereby rapidly reversing its effects. Serious effects on the heart may also occur from a zopiclone overdose when combined with piperazine.

Death certificates show the number of zopiclone-related deaths is on the rise. When taken alone, it usually is not fatal, but when mixed with alcohol or other drugs such as opioids, or in patients with respiratory, or hepatic disorders, the risk of a serious and fatal overdose increases.

Interactions
Zopiclone also interacts with trimipramine and caffeine.

Alcohol has an additive effect when combined with zopiclone, enhancing the adverse effects including the overdose potential of zopiclone significantly. Due to these risks and the increased risk for dependence, alcohol should be avoided when using zopiclone.

Erythromycin appears to increase the absorption rate of zopiclone and prolong its elimination half-life, leading to increased plasma levels and more pronounced effects. Itraconazole has a similar effect on zopiclone pharmacokinetics as erythromycin. The elderly may be particularly sensitive to the erythromycin and itraconazole drug interaction with zopiclone. Temporary dosage reduction during combined therapy may be required, especially in the elderly.
Rifampicin causes a very notable reduction in half-life of zopiclone and peak plasma levels, which results in a large reduction in the hypnotic effect of zopiclone. Phenytoin and carbamazepine may also provoke similar interactions. Ketoconazole and sulfaphenazole interfere with the metabolism of zopiclone. Nefazodone impairs the metabolism of zopiclone leading to increased zopiclone levels and marked next-day sedation.

Pharmacology
The therapeutic pharmacological properties of zopiclone include hypnotic, anxiolytic, anticonvulsant, and myorelaxant properties. Zopiclone and benzodiazepines bind to the same sites on GABAA receptors, causing an enhancement of the actions of GABA to produce the therapeutic and adverse effects of zopiclone. The metabolite of zopiclone called desmethylzopiclone is also pharmacologically active, although it has predominately anxiolytic properties. One study found some slight selectivity for zopiclone on α1 and α5 subunits, although it is regarded as being unselective in its binding to GABAA receptors containing α1, α2, α3, and α5 subunits. Desmethylzopiclone has been found to have partial agonist properties, unlike the parent drug zopiclone, which is a full agonist. The mechanism of action of zopiclone is similar to benzodiazepines, with similar effects on locomotor activity and on dopamine and serotonin turnover.
A meta-analysis of randomised controlled clinical trials that compared benzodiazepines to zopiclone or other Z drugs such as zolpidem and zaleplon has found few clear and consistent differences between zopiclone and the benzodiazepines in sleep onset latency, total sleep duration, number of awakenings, quality of sleep, adverse events, tolerance, rebound insomnia, and daytime alertness.
Zopiclone is in the cyclopyrrolone family of drugs. Other cyclopyrrolone drugs include suriclone. Zopiclone, although molecularly different from benzodiazepines, shares an almost identical pharmacological profile as benzodiazepines, including anxiolytic properties. Its mechanism of action is by binding to the benzodiazepine site and acting as a full agonist, which in turn positively modulates benzodiazepine-sensitive GABAA receptors and enhances GABA binding at the GABAA receptors to produce zopiclone's pharmacological properties. In addition to zopiclone's benzodiazepine pharmacological properties, it also has some barbiturate-like properties.

Pharmacokinetics

After oral administration, zopiclone is rapidly absorbed, with a bioavailability around 75–80%. Time to peak plasma concentration is 1–2 hours. A high-fat meal preceding zopiclone administration does not change absorption (as measured by AUC), but reduces peak plasma levels and delays its occurrence, thus may delay the onset of therapeutic effects.

The plasma protein-binding of zopiclone has been reported to be weak, between 45 and 80% (mean 52–59%). It is rapidly and widely distributed to body tissues, including the brain, and is excreted in urine, saliva, and breast milk. Zopiclone is partly extensively metabolized in the liver to form an active N-demethylated derivative (N-desmethylzopiclone) and an inactive zopiclone-N-oxide. Hepatic enzymes playing the most significant role in zopiclone metabolism are CYP3A4 and CYP2E1. In addition, about 50% of the administered dose is decarboxylated and excreted via the lungs. In urine, the N-demethyl and N-oxide metabolites account for 30% of the initial dose. Between 7 and 10% of zopiclone is recovered from the urine, indicating extensive metabolism of the drug before excretion. The terminal elimination half-life of zopiclone ranges from 3.5 to 6.5 hours (5 hours on average).

The pharmacokinetics of zopiclone in humans are stereoselective. After oral administration of the racemic mixture, Cmax (time to maximum plasma concentration), area under the plasma time-concentration curve (AUC) and terminal elimination half-life values are higher for the dextrorotatory enantiomers, owing to the slower total clearance and smaller volume of distribution (corrected by the bioavailability), compared with the levorotatory enantiomer. In urine, the concentrations of the dextrorotatory enantiomers of the N-demethyl and N-oxide metabolites are higher than those of the respective antipodes.

The pharmacokinetics of zopiclone are altered by aging and are influenced by renal and hepatic functions. In severe chronic kidney failure, the area under the curve value for zopiclone was larger and the half-life associated with the elimination rate constant longer, but these changes were not considered to be clinically significant. Sex and race have not been found to interact with pharmacokinetics of zopiclone.

Chemistry
The melting point of zopiclone is 178 °C. Zopiclone's solubility in water, at room temperature (25 °C) are 0.151 mg/mL. The logP value of zopiclone is 0.8.

Detection in biological fluids
Zopiclone may be measured in blood, plasma, or urine by chromatographic methods. Plasma concentrations are typically less than 100 μg/L during therapeutic use, but frequently exceed 100 μg/L in automotive vehicle operators arrested for impaired driving ability and may exceed 1000 μg/L in acutely poisoned patients. Post mortem blood concentrations are usually in a range of 400 to 3900 μg/L in victims of fatal acute overdose.

History
Zopiclone was developed and first introduced in 1986 by Rhône-Poulenc S.A., now part of Sanofi-Aventis, the main worldwide manufacturer. Initially, it was promoted as an improvement on benzodiazepines, but a recent meta-analysis found it was no better than benzodiazepines in any of the aspects assessed. On April 4, 2005, the U.S. Drug Enforcement Administration listed zopiclone under schedule IV, due to evidence that the drug has addictive properties similar to benzodiazepines.

Zopiclone, as traditionally sold worldwide, is a racemic mixture of two stereoisomers, only one of which is active. In 2005, the pharmaceutical company Sepracor of Marlborough, Massachusetts, began marketing the active stereoisomer eszopiclone under the name Lunesta in the United States. This had the consequence of placing what is a generic drug in most of the world under patent control in the United States. Generic forms of Lunesta have since become available in the United States. Zopiclone is currently available off-patent in a number of European countries, as well as Brazil, Canada, Hong Kong, and New Zealand. The eszopiclone/zopiclone difference is in the dosage—the strongest eszopiclone dosage contains 3 mg of the therapeutic stereoisomer, whereas the highest zopiclone dosage (10 mg) contains 5 mg of the active stereoisomer. The two agents have not yet been studied in head-to-head clinical trials to determine the existence of any potential clinical differences (efficacy, side effects, developing dependence on the drug, safety, etc.).

Society and culture

Recreational use
Zopiclone has the potential for non-medical use, dosage escalation, and drug dependence. It is taken orally and sometimes intravenously when used non-medically, and often combined with alcohol to achieve euphoria. Patients abusing the drug are also at risk of dependence. Withdrawal symptoms can be seen after long-term use of normal doses even after a gradual reduction regimen. The Compendium of Pharmaceuticals and Specialties recommends zopiclone prescriptions not exceed 7 to 10 days, owing to concerns of addiction, tolerance, and physical dependence. Two types of drug misuse can occur: either recreational misuse, wherein the drug is taken to achieve a high, or when the drug is continued long-term against medical advice. Zopiclone may be more addictive than benzodiazepines. Those with a history of substance misuse or mental health disorders may be at an increased risk of high-dose zopiclone misuse. High dose misuse of zopiclone and increasing popularity amongst people who use substances who have been prescribed with zopiclone The symptoms of zopiclone addiction can include depression, dysphoria, hopelessness, slow thoughts, social isolation, worrying, sexual anhedonia, and nervousness.

Zopiclone and other sedative hypnotic drugs are detected frequently in cases of people suspected of driving under the influence of drugs. Other sedating drugs, including benzodiazepines and zolpidem, are also found in high numbers of suspected drugged drivers. Many drivers have blood levels far exceeding the therapeutic dose range and often in combination with alcohol, illegal, or addictive prescription drugs, suggesting a high degree of potential for non-medical use of benzodiazepines, zolpidem, and zopiclone. Zopiclone, which at prescribed doses causes moderate impairment the next day, has been estimated to increase the risk of vehicle accidents by 50%, causing an increase of 503 excess accidents per 100,000 persons. Zaleplon or other nonimpairing sleep aids were recommended be used instead of zopiclone to reduce traffic accidents. Zopiclone, as with other hypnotic drugs, is sometimes used to carry out criminal acts such as sexual assaults.

Zopiclone has crosstolerance with barbiturates and is able to suppress barbiturate withdrawal symptoms. It is frequently self-administered intravenously in studies on monkeys, suggesting a high risk of addictive potential.

Zopiclone is in the top ten medications obtained using a false prescription in France.

References

External links
 Detailed pharmacological information 
 Scheduling recommendation (PDF file)
 Details on scheduling
 Erowid zopiclone vault
 Support for zopiclone dependency/addiction

Carbamates
Cyclopyrrolones
Lactams
Nonbenzodiazepines
Chloropyridines
Piperazines
Pyrrolopyrazines
Sanofi
GABAA receptor positive allosteric modulators